Tomás Waters (born 16 February 1987 in Wexford, Ireland) is an Irish sportsperson. He plays hurling with his local club St Martin's and is a member of the Wexford senior inter-county team.

Playing career

Club
Waters plays with his local hurling club St Martin's. He first joined senior level in early 2007 when Wexford were struggling a fair bit in the hurling.

Inter-county
Waters made his senior debut against Offaly in the Leinster Quarter-Final after being selected by new manager Colm Bonnar to replace one of the injured key players which turned to be a great success where he scored two points each and earned a win with the scoreline 2-17 to 0-16.

References

1987 births
Living people
St Martin's (Wexford) hurlers
Wexford inter-county hurlers